Brynjar Aa often Brynjar Å (born 21 July 1960 in Trondheim) is a Norwegian dramatist. He was a student at the Telemark University College and studied under Norwegian writer Eldrid Lunden. Before finishing at Bø, Aa published the book Babyboy.

Brynjar Aa has published over a dozen different works, all by established publishing houses, including Aschehoug, and The Norwegian Broadcasting Corporation. His work has also been reviewed in Dag og Tid and Dagbladet, and some of them have been controversial.

Bibliography 

 1981 Tjukken
 1982 Gords barn
 1983 Babyboy
 1986 Clæsh
 1987 Flipper ; Clæsh ; Syx
 1999 Trondheim eller Det evangeliske,eventyrlige og smått dileriske stevet om en reise til NidaRus inkl. Epilog
 1999 Schlappz

References

External links 
 

Norwegian male film actors
Living people
1960 births
Norwegian male dramatists and playwrights
20th-century Norwegian dramatists and playwrights